The Dayton Masonic Center, formerly the Dayton Masonic Temple, is a significant building in Dayton, Ohio.

It was built by a Masonic Temple Association formed from 14 Masonic groups.  The building was finished in 2 years and 9 months, by 450 workers, most of whom were Masonic Brethren, of whom it was said "Without thought of honor or gain, these men gave unstintingly of their time, abilities and means, sparing neither themselves nor their personal interests to advance this building project to its happy fulfillment."

It is made of steel, cement, and stone, including  of Bedford stone and  hard limestone and marble from Vermont, Alabama, and Tennessee.

It is a contributing property in the Steele's Hill-Grafton Hill Historic District, which was added to the National Register of Historic Places in 1986.  The building is also included in a locally designated historic district.

See also
List of Masonic buildings

References

External links 
 Dayton Masonic Center

Masonic buildings completed in 1928
Buildings and structures in Dayton, Ohio
Masonic buildings in Ohio
Clubhouses on the National Register of Historic Places in Ohio
Historic district contributing properties in Ohio
National Register of Historic Places in Montgomery County, Ohio